"Unwound" is a song written by Dean Dillon and Frank Dycus, and recorded by American country music artist George Strait.  It was released in April 1981 as his major label debut single and served as the lead single from his debut album Strait Country. It peaked at No. 6 on the United States Billboard Hot Country Singles chart and is Strait's first top-ten hit.

Background
Dean Dillon and Frank Dycus originally wrote the song for Johnny Paycheck, but Paycheck was in jail at the time. Record producer Blake Mevis drove over to Dillon's house in 1980, where Dillon and Dycus were writing songs on the front porch, and asked them if they had any new songs for a 'new kid from Texas.' Since Paycheck would not be using it, they gave the song to Mevis for George Strait. Dillon has gone on to write or co-write over 40 songs that have been recorded by Strait.

Content
The song is about a man having issues with his woman. He is out drinking because that woman he “had wrapped around [his] finger just come unwound".

Critical reception
Kevin John Coyne of Country Universe gave the song an A grade, saying that it "would be a great record just for the fiddle alone, but a very youthful Strait is still able to deliver the goods, and the band is so country that you can almost smell the sawdust when they let loose."

Chart positions

References

1981 songs
1981 singles
George Strait songs
Songs written by Dean Dillon
Songs written by Frank Dycus
MCA Records singles